Genesis is the third album from Christian pop artist Joy Williams, with singles "Hide", "We" and "Say Goodbye".

Track listing

Singles
"Hide"
"We"
"Say Goodbye"
"God Only Knows"

Personnel 
 Joy Williams – all vocals 
 Jeremy Bose – programming 
 Stephen Leiweke – guitars 
 Matt Bronleewe – additional guitars 
 James Gregory – bass 
 Joe Porter – drums 
 Keith Getty – string arrangements 
 Joni McCabe – string conductor 
 The City of Prague Philharmonic Orchestra – strings

Production 
 Matt Bronleewe – producer 
 Robert Beeson – executive producer 
 Michael Blanton – executive producer 
 Jason McArthur – executive producer 
 Aaron Swihart – recording 
 Michael Morena – recording assistant 
 Milan Jílek – strings recording 
 Chris Henning – digital editing 
 F. Reid Shippen – mixing 
 Lee Bridges – mix assistant 
 Greg Calbi – mastering 
 Michelle Pearson – A&R production
 Alice Smith – production coordinator 
 Stephanie McBrayer – art direction 
 Tim Parker – design 
 Andrew Southam – photography 
 Maude – stylist
 Sabrina Paul – hair, make-up 
 Joy Williams – liner notes 
 Blanton, Harrell, Cooke & Corzine – management 

Studios
 Recorded at Platinum Lab and Pentavarit (Nashville, Tennessee).
 Strings recorded at Studio A of The Czech Television.
 Mastered at Sterling Sound (New York City, New York).

Chart performance
 #18 Top Christian Albums
 #17 Top Heatseekers
 #26 Top Independent Albums

Awards

In 2006, the album was nominated for a Dove Award for Pop/Contemporary Album of the Year at the 37th GMA Dove Awards. The song "Hide" was also nominated for Pop/Contemporary Recorded Song of the Year.

References

2005 albums
Joy Williams (singer) albums